Simataa Secondary School is a school in the Caprivi Region of Namibia. It is situated near the headquarters of the Mafwe traditional authority in Chinchimane, some 70 km south of Katima Mulilo. Patron of the school is Deputy Minister of Information and Communication Technology, Stanley Simataa.

See also
 Education in Namibia
 List of schools in Namibia

References

Schools in Zambezi Region